The 2007 Men's Hockey Champions Challenge took place in Boom, Belgium from June 23 to July 1, 2007.

Argentina earned a spot at the 2008 Champions Trophy in Rotterdam, Netherlands after having defeated New Zealand in the final.

Squads

Head Coach: Sergio Vigil

Head Coach: Giles Bonnet

Head Coach: Jason Lee

Head Coach: Joaquim Carvalho

Head Coach: Akira Takahashi

Head Coach: Shane McLeod

Umpires
Below is the eight umpires appointed by International Hockey Federation (FIH):

Results
All times are Central European Summer Time (UTC+02:00)

Pool

Classification

Fifth and sixth place

Third and fourth place

Final

Awards

Statistics

Final ranking

References

External links
Official FIH website
Official website

Champions Challenge
Hockey Champions Challenge Men
International field hockey competitions hosted by Belgium
Men's Hockey Champions Challenge I
Sport in Boom, Belgium
Hockey Champions Challenge Men